The Four-man event in the IBSF World Championships 2016 was held on 20 and 21 February 2016.

Results
The first two runs were started at 15:34 on 20 February 2016 and the last two runs on 21 February at 15:34.

References

Four-man